Reflections is a 1970 album composed by Manos Hatzidakis and performed by New York Rock & Roll Ensemble.

The album was originally composed in New York City where Manos Hatzidakis was living since 1966. The lyrics are in English.

In 1993 the album was re-released with new lyrics in Greek, which were written by Nikos Gatsos and performed by Aliki Kagialoglou.

In 2005 an adaptation of the album by the Greek band Raining Pleasure was released.

Track listing

References

External links
Reflections on Allmusic.com
Ο Αμερικανός Μάνος (BHMAgazino)  http://www.tovima.gr/vimagazino/interviews/article/?aid=885102

1970 albums
New York Rock & Roll Ensemble albums
Manos Hatzidakis albums
Atco Records albums